Marc Racicot (born July 24, 1948) is an American attorney, lobbyist, politician and former member of the Republican Party who served as the 21st Governor of Montana from 1993 until 2001. After leaving office, Racicot worked as a lobbyist for the law firm Bracewell & Giuliani. His notable clients included Enron, Burlington Northern Santa Fe, and the Recording Industry Association of America.

He was chairman of the Republican National Committee from 2002 until 2003, when he was appointed as the chairman of the Bush re-election campaign. In 2000 as well as 2004 he was rumored to be Bush's choice for United States Attorney General. During the 2000 election, some saw him as a possible running mate for Bush. The Washington Post described him as "one of Bush's closest friends and advisers". In September 2020, he announced his intention to vote for Joe Biden, the Democratic nominee in the 2020 presidential election.

Early life and education
Racicot was born in Thompson Falls, Montana. His ancestors came to the Montana Territory in the 1860s. Marc's grandfather arrived in Libby, Montana, in 1917 to work as a logging camp cook in northwestern Montana for J. Neils Lumber Company.  Marc Racicot was born to Bill and Pat Racicot on July 24, 1948, in Thompson Falls. He was raised in Miles City, Montana, and Libby. His parents owned a foster home. His father was also a teacher, high school basketball coach, and track coach. He graduated from Libby High School. Racicot received a bachelor's degree in English from Carroll College in 1970. He was a starting basketball player in high school as well at Carroll College. He earned a J.D. degree in 1973 from the University of Montana School of Law in Missoula, Montana.

Career
Racicot had previously been an Army ROTC graduate. He attended The JAG School at the University of Virginia and entered U.S. Army JAG Corps. He was immediately assigned as a prosecutor in the Army JAG Corps from 1973 to 1976. He was stationed in West Germany where he served as Chief Prosecutor for the largest U.S. military jurisdiction in Europe. While there, he also taught business and criminal law for the University of Maryland. After three years, he was discharged from the Army as a captain and returned to Montana in 1976.

He became the deputy county attorney for Missoula County from 1976 to 1977. After that, he became a special prosecutor for Montana statewide in 1977, and served in that position until 1988. During this time, he had a conviction rate of 95%. He lost only two cases in twelve years. He convicted Don and Dan Nichols, who both abducted Kari Swenson, an Olympic athlete, and murdered a would-be rescuer. In May 1985, Dan Nichols was sentenced to 20 years for kidnapping and assault. In September 1985, Don Nichols was sentenced to 85 years for kidnapping, murder, and aggravated assault. In 1980 he ran for chief justice of the Montana Supreme Court, but was unsuccessful. He also ran for district judge in Lewis & Clark County in 1982 and Broadwater County in 1984, but lost both elections.

Racicot was the special prosecutor in the 1984 murder trial of Barry Beach, who was convicted of killing teenager Kim Nees near Poplar, Montana, in 1979, at age 17, and was sentenced to life without parole. Beach maintains that he is innocent and that his confession was coerced, while Racicot is convinced of his guilt. Beach's appeals were unsuccessful, with the Montana Supreme Court rejecting a bid to overturn his conviction by a 4–3 vote. Beach's petitions for clemency to the state Board of Pardons and Parole were opposed by Racicot, but supported by other prominent Montanans, such as Jon Tester and Brian Schweitzer. At a clemency hearing, Racicot acknowledged that law enforcement had created a "mess" by contaminating the crime scene, but testified that Beach's detailed confession was strong evidence of his guilt, and disputed the plausibility of alternate accounts of Nees' murder.

Attorney General of Montana
In 1988, he ran for Attorney General of Montana. He defeated Democratic nominee Mike McGrath, the Lewis and Clark County Attorney, 52%-48%. He served as Attorney General until January 1993.

Governor of Montana

Elections
In 1992, incumbent Governor Stan Stephens declined to run due to health problems. Racicot decided to run and easily won the Republican primary by defeating Andy Bennett 69%-31%. He won every county in the state. He then competed with Democratic State Representative Dorothy Bradley of Bozeman. Both candidates called for a 4% sales tax, but differed on how to spend such a tax. Racicot defeated her 51%-49%, a difference of 10,980 votes.

In 1996, Racicot ran for re-election. He easily defeated Rob Natelson in the Republican primary, 76%-24%. He was challenged in the general election by long-time state State Senator Chet Blaylock. Polls showed that Racicot maintained a sizable lead over Blaylock during the campaign. A few weeks before the election however, Blaylock unexpectedly died of a heart attack on the way to a debate. Reluctantly, his little known running mate, Judy Jacobson continued the drive but had little time to launch her own campaign. Because the election was so near, the voting ballots could only be changed to show Jacobson running for both governor and lieutenant governor. In one of the largest margins in state history, Racicot defeated Jacobson, 79%–21%, winning every county in the state.

Tenure
After working with the Montana State Legislature to eliminate the $200 million deficit in 1993, the Racicot Administration produced a $22.4 million budget surplus the year after. They used the surplus to cut taxes.

As governor, Racicot approved legislation that deregulated the utility sector in Montana. This legislation was sought by the Montana Power Company, the major utility supplier in the state. Following passage, the Montana Power Company divested itself of its utility operations and became a telecommunications company. The company filed for bankruptcy a few years later. The final result of this sweeping deregulation of Montana's utilities was a drastic rise in rates for most of the power customers in Montana. Workers with pensions from Montana Power were suddenly left without income.

Chairman of the RNC
On December 5, 2001, President George W. Bush announced that he would appoint Racicot, a strong Bush ally, to become the Chairman of the Republican National Committee. He was one of Bush's earliest supporters and was a very effective spokesman for the Bush campaign in the recount debacle. In addition, Racicot was Bush's first choice for U.S. Attorney General, but he took himself off the list for personal reasons. In order to be confirmed, he severed ties to lobbying organizations that were connected to Enron. On January 18, 2002, the 165-member RNC unanimously ratified Racicot.

Racicot was extremely successful as the Republican party performed very well in the 2002 midterm elections. Republicans took control of the U.S. Senate, making Bill Frist the Senate Majority Leader. In the wake of the McCain-Feingold finance reform, the RNC raised a record-$250 million in soft money.

In January 2003, he decided to resign to become Chairman of Bush's 2004 re-election campaign.  Bush appointed Ed Gillespie as the next Chairman of the RNC.

2004 presidential election

Racicot was the Chairman of Bush's re-election campaign from 2003 to 2004, the entire election cycle. He said of his job: "I'm just a utility infielder." Racicot called Bush's opponent, U.S. Senator John Kerry, "out of the mainstream" and dismissed all polls suggesting Kerry would win. He also said Kerry's "record on defense and intelligence funding is not defensible."

Bush won re-election to a second term, defeating Kerry 51%-48%.

Private sector career
Racicot was president of the American Insurance Association (AIA), an insurance industry lobbying group from June 13, 2005 to February 1, 2009.

He is a member of the board of directors of MassMutual, Weyerhaeuser and Jobs for America's Graduates, He was formerly a member of the Board of Visitors for the University of Montana School of Law.  He is also a past member of the Board of Directors of the Corporation for National and Community Service and United Way, and was a member of the Carroll College Board of Trustees.

He is a former partner at the Texas-based law firm Bracewell & Giuliani.

Support of Democrats
In 2020, Racicot was a strident supporter of Joe Biden. In 2022, he opposed any Republican for office if they supported Trump over Biden.

Electoral history

References

External links
 

|-

|-

|-

|-

1948 births
American prosecutors
Carroll College (Montana) alumni
Republican Party governors of Montana
United States Army Judge Advocate General's Corps
Living people
Montana Attorneys General
Republican National Committee chairs
People from Libby, Montana
People from Miles City, Montana
People from Thompson Falls, Montana
United States Army officers
The Judge Advocate General's Legal Center and School alumni